Hide and Seek is an American horror-thriller film written and directed by Joel David Moore. It is a remake of the 2013 Korean film of the same name. The film stars Jonathan Rhys Meyers, Jacinda Barrett, Joe Pantoliano and Mustafa Shakir. It premiered theatrically and on video on demand platforms on November 19, 2021.

Cast
 Jonathan Rhys Meyers as Noah Blackwell
 Jacinda Barrett as Samantha Blackwell
 Joe Pantoliano as Collin Carmichael
 Mustafa Shakir as Frankie Pascarillo

Production
In December 13, 2017, was announced that an English remake of the Korean film of the same name would be adapted and directed by Moore. Saban Films acquired North American, UK and Irish rights in the Spring of 2021 giving the film a limited theatrical release in the U.S. in November 2021.

Reception
Common Sense Media rated the film 2 out of 5 stars.  The film has a 13% rating on Rotten Tomatoes based on 8 reviews.

References

External links
 

2020s English-language films
2021 films
2021 horror films
American horror thriller films
2020s American films